Samuel Henrique Silva Guimaraes (born July 23, 1989) is a Brazilian football player.

Club statistics

References
j-league

1989 births
Living people
Brazilian footballers
Brazilian expatriate footballers
Expatriate footballers in Japan
J2 League players
Sagan Tosu players
Association football midfielders